Radosław Jacek (born 23 January 1986 in Opole) is a Polish football manager and former player, currently in charge of Unia Tarnów.

External links 
 

1986 births
Living people
Sportspeople from Opole
Polish footballers
Wisła Kraków players
Zagłębie Sosnowiec players
Bruk-Bet Termalica Nieciecza players
Okocimski KS Brzesko players
ŁKS Łódź players
Ekstraklasa players
I liga players
II liga players
Association football defenders
Polish football managers